The Chiclayo Province is one of three provinces of the Lambayeque Region in Peru.

Boundaries
North Lambayeque Province, Ferreñafe Province
East Cajamarca Region
South La Libertad Region
West Pacific Ocean

Political Division
The province is divided into twenty districts, which are.

Chiclayo
Chongoyape
Etén
Etén Puerto
José Leonardo Ortíz
La Victoria
Lagunas
Monsefú
Nueva Arica
Oyotún
Picsi
Pimentel
Reque
Santa Rosa
Saña
Cayalti
Patapo
Pomalca
Pucalá
Tumán

Population
The province has an estimated province of 729,433 inhabitants.

Capital
The capital of this province is the city of Chiclayo which is the fourth largest in Peru.

Relief
The terrain of the province is mainly flat, with smooth slopes which rise from west to east. Here can be observed slight undulations and uneven elevations formed by continuous alluvial actions, both natural and man-made. The cultive lands have been object of an intense work of leveling to facilitate the irrigation.

See also
Lambayeque Region
Administrative divisions of Peru

References

Provinces of the Lambayeque Region